The Silent Partner is a 1923 American silent drama film produced by Famous Players-Lasky and released through Paramount Pictures. It was based on a series of articles from the Saturday Evening Post by Maximilian Foster and directed by Charles Maigne. Leatrice Joy  and Owen Moore star in the feature. The film is a remake of the 1917 film of the same name.

Plot
As described in a film magazine review, Lisa Coburn is a young wife who has seen the folly of living on all that her husband earns when he is on Wall Street. She determines, unknown to  her husband George, to prepare against any coming disaster. The husband's employee is infatuated with the young wife and plans to ruin the husband and obtain her. His plans succeed, but he fails to win the wife. Instead, she goes to the husband, who has left her in anger and haste, and wins him back by convincing him of the truth of her story.

Cast

Preservation
With no prints of The Silent Partner located in any film archives, it is a lost film.

References

External links

 
 
 
 
 Coming attraction; lantern slide
 Still with Leatrice Joy and Robert Edeson at silentfilmstillarchive.com

1923 films
1923 drama films
Silent American drama films
American silent feature films
American black-and-white films
Famous Players-Lasky films
Films based on short fiction
Films directed by Charles Maigne
Remakes of American films
Paramount Pictures films
Lost American films
1923 lost films
Lost drama films
1920s American films